Englewood STEM High School (ESHS) is a public 4–year high school located in the Englewood neighborhood of Chicago, Illinois, United States. Opened on September 3, 2019, Englewood STEM is a part of the Chicago Public Schools district.

History 
Planning for Englewood STEM began in 2017 when the Chicago Board of Education decided to close Robeson High School due to declining enrollment and poor academic performance. Construction of Englewood STEM, an $85 million high school began in July 2018, after the demolition of Robeson the previous month. Englewood STEM was completed in August 2019, opening its doors for ninth graders on September 3, 2019.

In addition to replacing Robeson, Englewood STEM also served as a replacement for: Harper High School, Hope College Prep and Team Englewood which were also deemed as under enrolled and poor academic performing schools by the school district. The school began serving grades 9–12, beginning in the 2022–2023 school year.

Other information
On April 25, 2022, Four people, a parent and three students were arrested and charged with misdemeanor battery along with criminal trespassing after a fight inside the school.

Athletics

Notable alumni

References

External links 
 Official website

Public high schools in Chicago
Educational institutions established in 2019
2019 establishments in Illinois